Ivonne Guzmán (born September 10, 1984, in Bogotá, Colombia) is a Colombian singer-songwriter and actress. She is best known for being a member of Argentine all-female band Bandana. She also acted as Inés in the Argentine version of theatre musical Hairspray.

Discography

With Bandana
 See Bandana discography.

Solo

Albums
 Duendes (2008)

Filmography

Film
 Vivir Intentando (2003) as Ivonne

Television
 Popstars: Argentina (2001) as herself

Theatre
 Hairspray Argentina (2007) as Inés

Awards 
 See Bandana awards.

External links 
 
 Official
 Official Website of Bandana

1982 births
Living people
21st-century Colombian actresses
21st-century Colombian women singers
Colombian pop singers
Singers from Bogotá
Actresses from Bogotá
Colombian film actresses
Colombian stage actresses
Colombian emigrants to Argentina
Bandana (pop band) members